The Dax Centre is a leader in the use of art to raise awareness and reduce stigma towards mental illness through art.   The Dax Centre houses and manages the Cunningham Dax Collection of art.

References

External links
 Dax Centre website https://www.daxcentre.org/the-dax-centre-about-us/ 

Art museums and galleries in Victoria (Australia)
2003 establishments in Australia